Bonded by Blood is the debut studio album by American thrash metal band Exodus. Although the album was completed in the summer of 1984, it was not released until 1985 due to issues with Exodus and the record label. It is considered one of the most influential thrash metal albums of all time. This is also the only full-length studio album of Exodus to feature Paul Baloff on vocals, though he was also on their 1982 Demo and appeared on their 1997 live album Another Lesson in Violence.

In 2008, Exodus re-recorded Bonded by Blood and re-released it as Let There Be Blood, featuring a new line-up of members aside from drummer Tom Hunting and guitarist Gary Holt who played on the original.

Album information
Bonded by Blood was originally titled A Lesson in Violence, but had its name changed when a suitable cover idea could not be found. An advance cassette copy of the album (with the original title) was widely distributed through the tape-trading network upon the record's completion late in the summer of 1984, creating an immense underground buzz prior to the official release of the LP. The release was delayed, however, due to problems with the artwork.

The song "Impaler" was originally to be featured on Bonded by Blood, but it was abandoned when Kirk Hammett took the main riff with him to Metallica (it was used on "Trapped Under Ice").

Album cover
The original album cover art was an illustration of good and evil conjoined twin infants. For the 1989 reissue this cover was replaced with the band logo on a red and black image of a crowd. The album was remastered and re-issued by Century Media in 1999 in Europe only, with two live tracks from its Combat re-release in 1989, featuring Steve Souza on vocals. This reissue from Century Media restored the original twin cover artwork.

Reception and legacy

In a contemporary review, Bernard Doe of Metal Forces defined Bonded by Blood "a classic album in the thrash metal sense which is sure to be sneered at by the unconverted and mainstream media." 

Bonded by Blood received a positive modern review from Eduardo Rivadavia of AllMusic, who states: "Had it been released immediately after it was recorded in 1984, Exodus' Bonded by Blood might be regarded today alongside Metallica's Kill 'Em All as one of the landmark albums responsible for launching the thrash metal wave" and adds that "Exodus were left to wonder what kind of impact they may have had without these setbacks." Rivadavia also described Bonded by Blood as "an album whose influence far exceeds its actual notoriety, and it remains a crucial piece of the thrash metal puzzle – essential." Canadian journalist Martin Popoff described Exodus as a band "doing what Metallica did best, and doing it with killer undeground savagery", and considered Bonded by Blood "a solid, forward-thinking record". However, he observed that their "purist lack of compromise made [Exodus] somehow toneless and haranguing compared to multi-dimensional personalities like Metallica and Megadeth."

Accolades
In 2013, Bonded by Blood was ranked number 80 on Metal Rules' 'Top 100 Heavy Metal Albums'. In August 2014, Revolver placed the album on its "14 Thrash Albums You Need to Own" list. The album was ranked number one on Loudwire'''s top ten list of "Thrash Albums NOT Released by the Big 4".

In 2017, Rolling Stone ranked Bonded by Blood as 45th on their list of "The 100 Greatest Metal Albums of All Time".

Thrash metal revival act Bonded by Blood named themselves after the album.

Track listing

Personnel
Writing, performance and production credits are adapted from the album liner notes.

Exodus
 Paul Baloff – vocals
 Gary Holt – guitar, backing vocals 
 Rick Hunolt – guitar, backing vocals 
 Rob McKillop – bass, backing vocals 
 Tom Hunting – drums

Additional personnel
Satan's Choir – backing vocals 

Production
 Ken Adams, Todd Gordon – executive producers
 Mark Whitaker – production, assistant engineer, mixing
 John Volaitis – engineer
 Robin Yeager – mixing at Tres Virgos Studios, San Rafael, California 
 Gordon Lyons "The Triple Threat" – mixing assistant
 George Horn – mixing, mastering at Fantasy Studios, Berkeley, California

Artwork and design
 Donald J. Munz – cover art, layout
 Richard A. Ferraro – cover painting

In popular culture
In the television series Cobra Kai'', the character Raymond "Stingray" mentions Bonded by Blood while being confronted by a neighbor.

References

Exodus (American band) albums
1985 debut albums
Combat Records albums